KMP may refer to:

 Hungarian Communist Party (Kommunisták Magyarországi Pártja)
 KMP Expressways Ltd, constructing the Kundli–Manesar–Palwal Expressway, Haryana, India
 Kempton Park railway station, Surrey, National Rail station code
 Kent M. Pitman, known as KMP
 Knuth–Morris–Pratt algorithm, a search algorithm
 K-Multimedia Player
 KM Produce, a Japanese adult video company